Feng Chen (born 29 August 1987) is a retired Chinese badminton player. She was selected to join the Chinese junior team competed at the 2002 and 2004 Asian Junior Championships, and has collected 2 gold medals from the girls' team event, a gold in the mixed doubles, and a silver in the girls' doubles. Feng then won the mixed team gold medal at the 2004 World Junior Championships, and also clinched the silver medal in the girls' doubles event. In the senior international level, she was the runners-up at the 2004 French and Polish International tournaments. Feng also was the mixed doubles semifinalist at the World Grand Prix tournament, in 2005 China Masters partnered with He Hanbin. At the 2006 World University Championships in China University of Geosciences, Wuhan, she claimed three gold medals in the women's doubles, mixed doubles, and team event.

Achievements

World Junior Championships 
Girls' doubles

Asian Junior Championships 
Girls' doubles

Mixed doubles

IBF International 
Women's doubles

References

External links 
 

1987 births
Living people
Badminton players from Hubei
Chinese female badminton players